C$ may refer to:

Currency 
 Canadian dollar, currency of Canada
 Nicaraguan córdoba, currency of Nicaragua 
 Confederate States dollar, historical currency of the Confederate States of America

Other uses 
 Administrative share, hidden network shares in Microsoft Windows

See also 

 $ (disambiguation)